Minev is a Bulgarian male surname, its feminine counterpart is Mineva. It may refer to
 Nikolay Minev (born 1931), Bulgarian chess player
Plamen Minev (born 1965), Bulgarian hammer thrower
Veselin Minev (born 1980), Bulgarian association football player
Yordan Minev (born 1980), Bulgarian association football player
 Nevena Mineva (born 1972), Bulgarian Olympic race walker